USAV General Frank S. Besson Jr. (LSV-1) is the lead ship of the General Frank S. Besson Jr.-class roll-on/roll-off of US Army.

Design 

Named in honor of Gen. Frank S. Besson Jr., former Chief of Transportation, U.S. Army, these ships have bow and stern ramps and the ability to beach themselves, giving them the ability to discharge 900 short tons of vehicles and cargo over the shore in as little as four feet of water, or 2,000 short tons as an intra-theater line haul roll-on/roll-off cargo ship. The vessel's cargo deck is designed to handle any vehicle in the US Army inventory and can carry up to 15 M1 Abrams main battle tanks or 82 ISO standard containers.

Construction and career 
She was acquired by the US Army on 19 September 1987 and commissioned in 1988 into the 335th Transportation Detachment, 7th Expeditionary Transportation Brigade. She is homeported in Fort Eustis.

Gallery

References

External links 
 Navsource – Photo Gallery
 Frank S Besson Class LSV Logistic Support Vessel
 LSVs at globalsecurity.org
 Photo gallery: Family tour aboard the LSV-7 Kuroda | The Honolulu Advertiser
 LSV-8 USAV MG Roberts Smalls – a set on Flickr
 Army Commissions Vessel Named after African-American Civil War Hero, S.C. Statesman
 Robert Smalls Official Website

Ships built in the United States
1987 ships
General Frank S. Besson-class support vessels